Asaoka (written: , ,  or ) is a Japanese surname. Notable people with the surname include:

, Japanese footballer
, Japanese pop singer and actress
, Japanese author of Glass Wings
, Japanese actress
, Japanese former football player
, Japanese actress and singer

Fictional characters
, a character from The Kabocha Wine manga series

See also
Asaoka High School Baseball Club Diary: Over Fence, manga series

Japanese-language surnames